Little Miss Hawkshaw is a 1921 American drama film written and directed by Carl Harbaugh. The film stars Eileen Percy, Eric Mayne, Leslie Casey, Donald Keith, Frank Clark and Vivian Ransome. The film was released on August 23, 1921, by Fox Film Corporation.

Cast           
Eileen Percy as Patricia 
Eric Mayne as Sir Stephen O'Neill
Leslie Casey as Patricia's husband
Donald Keith as Arthur Hawks 
Frank Clark as Mike Rorke
Vivian Ransome as Miss Rorke
J. Farrell MacDonald as Inspector Hahn
Fred L. Wilson as J. Spencer Giles
Glen Cavender as Sock Wolf

References

External links
 

1921 films
Silent American drama films
1921 drama films
Fox Film films
Films directed by Carl Harbaugh
American silent feature films
American black-and-white films
1920s American films